Desmos chinensis is a flowering plant of the custard-apple family, Annonaceae. The yellowish-green flowers are similar to the Ylang-ylang flowers, therefore this plant is sometimes known as dwarf ylang-ylang. Their smell, however, is much less strong and is only felt in the morning. By midday it has mostly faded away.

Description and habitat
It is a vine or spreading shrub that may grow up to 4 m high if it finds an adequate support, otherwise it rarely grows taller than 150 cm. Its pollen is shed as permanent tetrads.

Desmos chinensis is found throughout Southeast Asia from Nepal to the Philippines. 
It grows at the edge of forests in flat areas at elevations up to 600 m. It may grow as a ruderal plant on the sides of roads, rural causeways and other disturbed terrain. It thrives in slightly shady places.

This tree is commonly used within the Bangkok urban landscape. Desmos chinensis is used to create shade along various sidewalks and bus stops. It is widely utilised in city settings, due to its dense leaf growth which provides cool shade, a relatively thin trunk and a root system that doesn't break sidewalk pavement.

References

External links

Plants of the Malay Peninsula - Desmos chinensis Lour.
Butterflycircle - Desmos chinensis, Dwarf Ylang Ylang

Annonaceae
Flora of tropical Asia
Medicinal plants of Asia